The following is a list of the schools operated by the Duval County School Board, d/b/a Duval County Public Schools.  The list is currently limited to high schools and middle schools.  Most of the schools listed are in Jacksonville, Florida, the county seat and its largest city by orders of magnitude. In 2021, the school board voted to rename the six schools named for Confederates.

High schools

Middle schools

References 

Education in Jacksonville, Florida
 
Jacksonville, Florida-related lists
Duval County